Achajur is a village in the Ijevan Municipality of the Tavush Province of Armenia. The 10th-13th century Makaravank Monastery is located near Achajur.

Toponymy 
The village was previously known as Achasu.

Gallery

References

External links 

Populated places in Tavush Province